Kerlin is both a given name and a surname. Notable people, and places with the name include:

Kerlin Blaise (born 1974), American football player
Frank Kerlin, Fianna Fáil politician
Gerard Kerlin (1910–1946), Irish chess player
Jacob Kerlin McKenty (1827–1866), American politician
Mark Kerlin (born 1962), American soccer player
Orie Kerlin (1891–1974), American baseball player
Robert T. Kerlin, American educator and activist
Scott Kerlin, American soccer player
Kerlin Gallery, an Irish contemporary art dealer